Farah Hussein Sharmarke (Af Soomaali: Faarax Xuseen Sharmaaarke, Arabic:فارح حسين شر ماركئ ) was a Somalian poet who composed poems during the 1940s and early 1950s whilst living in Isiolo, Kenya.

Biography
Farah was born in 1926 in the city of Bardera in Gedoregion in south western Somalia. He studied poetry from other famous Gedo region poets and play writes including Guled Jufe and Mohamed Nur Shareco.

From Established Young Poet to Quitting Composing Poems Ubruptly
Farah Hussein became an established poet in the early 1940s. Farah Hussein composed most of his poems while in either Bardera, Garbahareyor in Isiolo in NFD region.

Quitting Poetry
Farah quit composing poems at the height of his poetic outburst and he composed an often quoted poem which he indicated as to why he quit, in short poem explaining in 16 lines all starting in the letter D.

Farah Hussein Sharmarke composed some of the best Somali poems in its classic wisdom form. He is in this category with such great poets like Haji Aden Ahmed Af-Qalooc and Osman Yusuf Kenadid. Farah Hussein achieved greatness in poetry at such an early age and the type of work he has left with us is currently classified under philosophic and wisdom by writer Mohamed Sheikh Hassan.

Works

Farah Hussein Sharmarke composed his last poems in 1952 while in Kenya. Voice recorded poems are available for his last half dozen poems just before his death in the early 1950s.

First numbered lines from 1-3 are in Af Somali while lines underneath from 1 to 3 are their English translations.

1- Shimbir duulis badanoow haddaad, degi aqoon weydo
The bird which is always flying around, Refusing to stay somewhere

2- Mar unbaad libaax labadii daan, dalaq tidhaahdaaye
Once  will land in the mouth of the lion

3- Iney edebtu shay doora tahay, yaan isaga daayey 
For that good behaviour is something important, I have stopped to compose
 Lix iyo Toban Haloo Deela, better known as "Shimbir Duulis badanoow", most referenced line from Farah Hussein Sharmarke's poems.
 Alif-ka-ya
 Nin la Dilay
 Bahalaley
 Atoor Guunyo

References

1926 births
Ethnic Somali people
Somalian poets
Gedo
Possibly living people